As of March 2018, Red Wings Airlines of Russia serves the following destinations:

References

Lists of airline destinations